Daniel Sea (born January 7, 1977) is an American filmmaker, actor and musician. They rose to prominence through their role as Max Sweeney on Showtime's drama series The L Word.

Personal life
Daniel grew up in Malibu, California, raised by hippie parents. When their father came out as gay, their mom was understanding and accepting. Their parents encouraged self expression and they weren’t forced to do stereotypical girl things. Despite an accepting home environment, they still had a rough childhood due to the way society viewed being queer and trans.

They ran away when they were 16 from L.A. and moved to the Bay Area, "like a good gay kid would."  While there in Berkeley, they joined the DIY/punk/feminist/artist space Gilman Street Project, studied improv acting in Laney College, and played in several punk rock bands, including The Gr'ups and Cypher in the Snow.

Sea traveled all over Europe and Asia. They hitchhiked through Turkey, did some street theatre, and performed as a fire juggler with a traveling circus in Poland. As a punk rocker, Sea and their band cross-dressed. At one point in their world travels, they lived in India for eight months as a man.

They had always been gender non-conforming in some way or another, being called a "tomboy" or "weird" as a child. Since moving more fully into the punk scene, Daniel was given the freedom to experiment and come to a greater understanding on their gender. In 2006, they said about their sexuality:

In a May 2021 interview with Drew Gregory, Daniel expanded upon their journey with gender. They talk about the beginnings of the language for non-binary identities and how they had to navigate that while playing a trans character, Max Sweeney, in the TV series The L Word. Sea later clarified their identity as trans, non-binary, gender expansive, and queer. They have also added the pronouns he/they to their bio on Instagram.

Career
After Sea returned from Europe, they moved to New York City and decided to re-enter the acting world, giving an audition tape to a friend who worked on The L Word'''s writing staff. Sea then got a call at their restaurant job in New York and was asked to fly to Los Angeles for an audition.  They were then offered to perform the role of Moira Sweeney, an androgynous computer technician who moves from the Midwest with Jenny (Mia Kirshner). Over the course of the season, Sweeney comes out as a trans man, adopting the name Max Sweeney. In 2022, Sea reprised the role in the third season of the sequel series The L Word: Generation Q. When the episode aired, Daniel Sea was interviewed by the LA Times ‘The L Word’ failed a trans TV pioneer. 17 years later, he’s back to repair the damage and Indie Wire ‘The L Word’ Star Daniel Sea on the ‘Reparative Gesture’ of Max’s Return about their experience performing the role of Max Sweeney and Daniel's return to the show. 

In their music career, with their girlfriend of the time, Bitch, formerly of Bitch and Animal, they helped to form a band called Bitch and the Exciting Conclusion. They were part of the band The Thorns of Life with their longtime friends Blake Schwarzenbach (formerly of Jawbreaker and Jets to Brazil) and Aaron Cometbus (of Pinhead Gunpowder and formerly Crimpshrine). The band toured the West Coast and played in New York City and Philadelphia from fall 2008 through winter 2009.  Besides The L Word, Sea's filmography also includes the films Shortbus (2006) (with Bitch, both as themselves) and Itty Bitty Titty Committee, released in 2007.  They also appeared in the John Cameron Mitchell-directed music video for Bright Eyes' "First Day of My Life" with Bitch. On February 17, 2009, they guest starred on an episode of Law & Order: Special Victims Unit as a transgender man, playing a similar role to Max Sweeney. 

Daniel was cast in a leading role in the film The Casserole Club.''  Co-starring Susan Traylor, Kevin Richardson, Pleasant Gehman, and Garrett Swann, the film is set in 1969 and deals with damaged relationships. Directed by acclaimed filmmaker Steve Balderson, filming took place in Wamego, Kansas during fall of 2010.

Sea currently plays in an unnamed music project with Will Schwartz. They played their second show at the Hammer Museum in Los Angeles, California, in October 2010.

References

External links

1977 births
21st-century American actors
Living people
Actors from California
American performance artists
American non-binary actors
Non-binary artists
Non-binary musicians
Jugglers
American punk rock guitarists
American accordionists
American indie rock musicians
People from Malibu, California
LGBT people from California
21st-century accordionists
21st-century American guitarists
20th-century American LGBT people
21st-century American LGBT people
Transgender non-binary people